Sophia (stylized as SOPHIA) is a Japanese rock band formed in 1994 by vocalist Mitsuru Matsuoka, guitarist Kazutaka Toyota, bassist Yoshio Kuroyanagi, drummer Yoshitomo Akamatsu and keyboardist Keiichi Miyako. Currently signed to Avex Trax since 2011, they made their major debut in 1995 on Toy's Factory. They changed over to Toshiba EMI in 2004, and Universal Music Japan in 2009.

Their album Alive was named one of the top albums from 1989-1998 in a 2004 issue of the music magazine Band Yarouze. Their single "-Boku wa Koko ni Iru-" was used as the 2nd ending theme for the anime Kaleido Star. Keyboardist Miyako announced on March 21, 2010 that he was diagnosed with lymphoma, and on April 10 the band went on a hiatus. Sophia, as a quartet, was a guest of honor at Anime Expo in Los Angeles from July 1–4, 2010, having their first concert in the US on the 3rd. The group ended the hiatus on August 13th, 2011, after a live show at the Nippon Budokan, but eventually ended up disbanding for good on August 12, 2013, following one more live show at the Nippon Budokan. On March 27th, 2022, Sophia announced their revival, and are scheduled to play their comeback live October 11th, which will also be at the Nippon Budokan.

Sophia is often considered a visual kei band, despite the fact that for nearly their entire career their appearance has been very tame compared to most others in the movement. On October 23, 2011, the band performed at V-Rock Festival 2011. Their song "Machi" was covered by Doremidan on the compilation Crush! -90's V-Rock Best Hit Cover Songs-, which was released on January 26, 2011 and features current visual kei bands covering songs from bands that were important to the '90s visual kei movement. "Gokigen Tori ~Crawler is Crazy~" was covered by Annie's Black on its sequel, Crush! 2 -90's V-Rock Best Hit Cover Songs-, that was released on November 23, 2011. "Eternal Flame" was covered by Makoto for Crash! 3 - 90's V-Rock Best Hit Cover Love Songs-, which was released on June 27, 2012 and features current visual kei bands covering love songs by visual kei bands of the 90's.

Members
 – vocals
 – guitar
 – bass
 – drums
 – keyboards

Discography

Singles
(1996.04.22) 「ヒマワリ」 (Himawari / Sunflower)
(1996.05.21) 「Early summer rain」
(1996.11.11) 「Believe」
(1997.02.19) 「little cloud」
(1997.07.09) 「街」 (Machi / Town)
(1997.11.27) 「君と揺れていたい」 (Kimi to yurete itai / I Want to be Swaying With You)
(1998.04.22) 「ゴキゲン鳥 ～crawler is crazy～」 (Gokigen tori ~crawler is crazy~ / High-spirited Bird)
(1998.11.26) 「黒いブーツ～oh my friend～」 (Kuroi Boots ~oh my friend~ / Black Boots)
(1999.03.25) 「ビューティフル」 (beautiful)
(1999.08.04) 「Place～」
(1999.12.15) 「OAR」
(2000.02.02) 「ミサイル」 (Missile)
(2000.10.18) 「walk」
(2001.01.17) 「進化論 ～GOOD MORNING!-HELLO! 21st-CENTURY～」 (Shinkaron ~GOOD MORNING!-HELLO! 21st-CENTURY~ / Theory of Evolution)
(2001.06.13) 「KURU KURU」
(2001.09.05) 「STRAWBERRY & LION」
(2001.11.21) 「Thank you」
(2002.02.27) 「HARD WORKER」
(2002.06.19) 「ROCK STAR」
(2002.10.09) 「未だ見ぬ景色」 (Mada minu keshiki / As Yet Unseen Landscape)
(2003.01.01) 「理由なきNewDays」 (Wake naki New Days / No Reason New Days)(+Separate limited edition version)
(2003.07.30) 「-僕はここにいる-」 (-Boku wa koko ni iru- / I'm Here)
(2004.05.12) 「旅の途中」 (Tabi no tochuu / On a Trip) (Limited)
(2004.05.19) 「please,please」 (Limited)
(2004.05.26) 「花は枯れて また咲く」 (Hana wa karete mata saku / A Flower Withers Then Later Blooms) (Limited)
(2004.08.04) 「青い季節」 (Aoi kisetsu / Blue Season)
(2005.04.27) 「ANSWER ～イチバンタダシイコタエ～」 (ANSWER ~ichiban tadashii kotae~ / Answer ~Most Correct Answer~)
(2005.07.06) 「one summer day」
(2006.02.22) 「エンドロール」 / 「brother & sister」 (Endroll) (+Separate limited edition version)
(2006.10.18) 「stain」
(2007.03.21) 「君と月の光」 (Kimi to Tsuki no Hikari / You and the Moonlight) (+Separate limited edition version)
(2007.07.18) 「星」 (Hoshi / Star)
(2007.09.12) 「青空の破片」 (Aozora no kakera / Piece of Blue Sky)
(2009.05.06) 「Baby Smile」
(2011.07.27) 「cod-E ~Eの暗号~」 (cod-E ~E no angou~ / cod-E ~The code of E~)
(2012.01.11) 「ｒａｉｎｂｏｗ　ｒａｉｎ／サヨナラ　愛しのピーターパンシンドローム」 (rainbow rain/Sayonara Itoshi no Peter Pan Syndrome)

Albums

EPs
(1995.03.21) 「SOPHIA」 (Independent Demo)
(1995.10.02) 「BOYS」
(1995.11.01) 「GIRLS」
(1996.07.01) 「Kiss the Future」

Full Length
(1997.04.23) 「little circus」(1998.05.20) 「ALIVE」(1999.04.14) 「マテリアル」 (Material)
(2001.03.07) 「進化論」 (Shinkaron / Theory of Evolution)
(2003.09.25) 「夢」 (Yume / Dream)
(2004.09.15) 「EVERBLUE」(2006.03.23) 「We」(2007.10.10) 「2007」(2009.06.24) 「BAND AGE」(2013.03.06) 「未来大人宣言」(Mirai Otona Sengen)

Live
(2000.01.01) 「1999」Compilations
(2001.12.19) 「THE SHORT HAND ～SINGLES COLLECTION」 (Singles)
(2001.12.19) 「THE LONG HAND ～MEMBERS' SELECTION 」 (Album Tracks + B-Sides)
(2005.11.02) 「10th ANNIVERSARY BEST」 (Fan-Selected Singles Collection)
(2010.01.20) 「15」 (15th Anniversary Song Remakes Album)
(2011.01.19) 「ALL SINGLES「A」」 (Complete Singles)
(2011.01.19) 「ALL B-SIDE「B」」 (Complete B-Sides)
(2011.01.19) 「ALL 1995〜2010」''' (Complete Single and B-Side Tracks)

References

External links
 
  by Avex Group
 Matsuoka Mitsuru official website
 Keiichi Miyako official Website

Avex Group artists
Universal Music Japan artists
Toy's Factory artists
Visual kei musical groups
Japanese alternative rock groups
Japanese pop rock music groups
Japanese power pop groups
Japanese art rock groups
Musical groups established in 1994
Musical groups from Osaka